The Lord-Lieutenant's Cadet is seen as the aide and representative of the cadet forces to the British royal family and the Lord-lieutenant in an administrative county of England, Scotland, Wales & Northern Ireland. Typically, one is chosen from each of the main cadet forces, the Army Cadet Force, Air Training Corps and Sea Cadets (United Kingdom). Occasionally, one may also be chosen from the Combined Cadet Force. They are selected each year at the Spring Lord-lieutenant's awards in each county.

They provide an essential link between the armed forces and the local community, assist with recruiting within the cadet forces and assist the county's Reserve Forces and Cadets Association. The cadet from each arm of the cadet forces is selected and appointed based on their outreach and participation within their squadron, detachment or unit, and is seen as one of the highest achievements in the Cadet Forces.

Bedfordshire

Oxfordshire

Greater London 
The Lord-Lieutenant's Cadets from the administrative county of Greater London (as of 1965) are appointed from one of the four "quadrants" of London. The locally elected cadets are then decided on, separately, rather than county-wide, like the other counties of the United Kingdom. The current Lord Lieutenant's Cadets of Greater London assumed position on 14 March 2021 and will hold their position until 14 March 2022.

Belfast

Midlothian

Suffolk

References 

Lord Lieutenants
Lord Lieutenancies